Oliva lacanientai is a species of sea snail, a marine gastropod mollusk in the family Olividae, the olives.

Description
The length of the shell varies between 9 mm and 26.5 mm.

Distribution
This marine species occurs off the Philippines, in the Eastern China Sea and off New Caledonia.

References

External links
 Gastropods.com: Oliva (Oliva) lacanientai[

lacanientai
Gastropods described in 1985